Alison Webster may refer to:

 Alison Webster (Coronation Street), a character in the British soap opera Coronation Street
 Alison Webster (photographer), official Page 3 photographer for The Sun newspaper